The Scoville Stardust JS-2 is a homebuilt aircraft designed for air racing.

Design and development
The Stardust is a single place midwing aircraft with a single engine and conventional landing gear. the fuselage is constructed of welded steel tubing with fabric covering. The wings are all wood construction.

Variants
Stardust II
Initial version
Stardust JS-2
Second version, powered by an  Continental engine.

Specifications (Stardust JS-2)

See also

References

Homebuilt aircraft
Racing aircraft